Frontier Southwest Incorporated is a Frontier Communications operating company in Texas. At its peak, Frontier Southwest served Arkansas, Oklahoma, Texas, and New Mexico.

History
Its original name upon founding was State Telephone Company of Texas. It later changed its name to Southwestern Associated Telephone Company, and General Telephone Company of the Southwest.

In 1996, Contel of New Mexico and Contel of Texas were merged into GTE Southwest.

Fragmentation
In 1999, GTE announced that it was going to sell 1.3 million access lines. GTE agreed to sell 400,000 lines in New Mexico and lines in rural areas of Texas to a company called Valor Telecom (later absorbed into Windstream Holdings).

In 2000, Bell Atlantic purchased GTE and renamed itself Verizon. Shortly thereafter, the pending sale of GTE Southwest's operations to Valor Telecom was completed. GTE Southwest's Arkansas operations in Arkansas, Missouri, and Oklahoma were sold to CenturyTel to become CenturyTel of Northwest Arkansas (GTE's operations in Arkansas were completely sold off). GTE Southwest retained its name and operations in more populated areas of Texas.

GTE Southwest was the only former GTE operating company that did not change its official legal name under Verizon ownership.

Sale to Frontier
On February 5, 2015, Verizon Communications announced a sale of its wired telecom operations in California, Florida, and Texas to Frontier Communications. GTE Southwest is included in the sale. The transaction is closed in the first half of 2016.

Following the sale, GTE Southwest was renamed Frontier Southwest Incorporated and began doing business under the name Frontier Communications of Texas.

Sources
FCC History: GTE Southwest, Inc. dba Verizon Southwest

References

Frontier Communications
Companies based in Irving, Texas
Communications in Texas
Economy of the Southwestern United States
Telecommunications companies established in 1926
1926 establishments in Texas
American companies established in 1926